Great Fridays was a Manchester-based product and service design company founded in 2008 by Matthew Farrar and Robert Noble.

In October 2014, the company was acquired by EPAM Systems, a product development and software engineering company.

Background 
Great Fridays was founded in late 2008 in Manchester by Matthew Farrar and Robert Noble with investment from Peter Gabriel, through his Real World Holdings company.

The company opened a second office in London in 2011. In December 2012, the company announced the opening of two further offices in San Francisco and New York City . 

Great Fridays was acquired by Epam Systems in October 2014. The company now employs more than 60 full-time staff.

In January 2012, the company acquired product design company Dekode.

The company has worked for Adobe, Imagination Technologies, Gucci, Sonos, Citrix, Microsoft, Experian, Thomson Reuters, Vodafone, Pearson, Williams Lea, among others.

Projects 

 PayPal - Developing and designing a shared central system that designers can use to access pattern guidance, images and assets.
 Adobe - Creating a business case and prototype app in Adobe Air run-time system for Android tablets. It was later released as Adobe Collage on iOS and Android.
 Thomson Reuters - Improving the existing Boardlink app which helps the companies board members to access, review and annotate sensitive business information at board level within the company.

References

External links 
Great Fridays' Official website

British companies established in 2008
Privately held companies of the United Kingdom
Companies based in Manchester
Design companies of the United Kingdom
2014 mergers and acquisitions